Kuyezbashevo (Köyäźebaş; , Măylăpukan) is a rural locality (a selo) and the administrative centre of Batyrovsky Selsoviet, Aurgazinsky District, Bashkortostan, Russia. The population was 618 as of 2010. There are 7 streets.

Geography 
Kuyezbashevo is located 12 km east of Tolbazy (the district's administrative centre) by road. Novoadzitarovo is the nearest rural locality.

References 

Rural localities in Aurgazinsky District